The Hirtenberg HV.15 was a twin-engine Austrian monoplane produced by Hirtenberg.

Design and development
The HV.15 was the company's first twin-engined aircraft, originally made for the civilian market. Designed for mass production, the aircraft was planned to be a passenger aircraft or light transport. The HV.15 first flew on March 8, 1936, powered by the most powerful engines available to Austria at the time, a pair of Siemens-Halske Sh 14A rotary engine, each producing .

Specifications

References

1930s Austrian civil utility aircraft